Malachi Green (born November 29, 2003), known professionally as Yung Kayo, is an American rapper from Washington, D.C. who is currently signed to American rapper Young Thug's record label YSL Records in a joint venture with 300 Entertainment. He is known for his fashion-related references in his music and eccentric vocal performance.

Early and personal life
Green's father was a DJ. As a teenager, he moved to Los Angeles from Washington, D.C., his native city.

Career
Green began rapping at the age of 10 after his older brother purchased a microphone. He would rap with group 40 Boyz which was composed of himself and his brothers. In 2019, he released his song "Glitch" which captured the attention of American rapper Young Thug.  In January 2020, he signed to the latter's record label YSL Records in a joint venture with 300 Entertainment. In 2020, he was featured as a model for Vogue's Spring 2020 Alyx Menswear fashion show. 

On April 16, 2021, the YSL Records album Slime Language 2 was released, which features Green on two tracks: "Proud of You" with Lil Uzi Vert, and "GFU". In May 2021, he released his single "Bstroy Socks". In January 2022, he released his single "Yeet" with American rapper Yeat which serves as the lead single to his album DFTK. In February 2022, he released his album DFTK. In July 2022, he and American rapper Yeat collaborated with the Sevensevenseven imprint and released a single titled "Hollon".  In November 2022, he released the single "150" for his upcoming EP Nineteen.  On November 29, 2022, on his 19th birthday, he released his EP Nineteen with an appearance from late American rapper and YSL Records signee Lil Keed.

Musical style
In a generally positive review for Yung Kayo's album DFTK, Paul A. Thompson writing for Pitchfork describes Yung Kayo's musical style in the following manner: "DFTK is not a comprehensive survey of everything Kayo can do as a vocalist. It smartly excises the flatter, more predictable modes he occasionally lapsed into on his earlier EPs, instead finding him at his most concentratedly chaotic, a steady dose of ungovernable energy."

Discography

Album
DFTK (2022)

EPs
Landed (2021)
Work in Progress (2021)
Happy Holidays (2019)
Sweet16 (2019)
Nineteen (2022)

References

External links 
 

African-American male rappers
21st-century American male musicians
Living people
2003 births
People from Washington, D.C.
Rappers from Washington, D.C.